Oscillations 2 is the seventh solo album by American composer Bill Laswell, released on June 1, 1998 by Sub Rosa.

Track listing

Personnel 
Adapted from the Oscillations 2 liner notes.
Musicians
Bill Laswell – bass guitar, drum programming, effects, producer
Technical personnel
Abdul Malik Mansur – cover art
Robert Musso – engineering

Release history

References

External links 
 

1998 albums
Bill Laswell albums
Albums produced by Bill Laswell
Sub Rosa Records albums